Faircrest Heights is a  neighborhood in Mid-City, Los Angeles, California.

History

Homes in Faircrest Heights were built in the 1920s and 1930s.  It was primarily a jewish neighborhood until the 1960s.

In December 2004, Los Angeles magazine named Faircrest Heights one of the "10 Best Districts You've Never Heard Of".

In 2018, then-mayor Eric Garcetti used Faircrest Heights as the location to unveil a $100 million rebate program from the Department of Water and Power.

Geography
Faircrest Heights is bounded by La Cienega Boulevard on the west, Fairfax Avenue on the east, Pico Boulevard on the north and Guthrie Avenue on the south.

According to Google Maps, Faircrest Heights is bounded by Alvira Street on the west, Fairfax Avenue on the east, Pico Boulevard on the north and Sawyer Street on the south.

Crestview and La Cienega Heights are located to the west; Reynier Village is southwest; Little Ethiopia, and South Carthay are to the north; and Picfair Village is to the east.

Government
Faircrest Heights is served by the P.I.C.O. Neighborhood Council. The map does not indicate a neighborhood called Faircrest Heights. Instead, the council breaks the area into two residential districts: “Neighbors United” and “C.H.A.P.S.”   Per the council bylaws, the two combined residential districts are bounded by La Cienega Boulevard on the west; Fairfax Avenue on the east; Pico Boulevard on the north; and David Avenue and Venice Boulevard on the south.

Demographics
Based on the 2010 Census, within the five census block groups that compose Faircrest Heights, racial representation is mixed with approximately 38% white, 37% African American, 8% Asian, and 18% other.

Education

 Los Angeles Center for Enriched Studies - 5931 W. 18th Street

Notable people
 Rita Hayworth

References

Notes

Neighborhoods in Los Angeles
Westside (Los Angeles County)
West Los Angeles